Nils Arfwidsson (7 May 1802, Göteborg – 14 April 1880, Stockholm) was a Swedish author, journalist, and government official.

Biography
He was born to Niklas Arfwidsson, a village counselor, and his wife, Anna Margareta née von Jacobsson, the daughter of a businessman. His family moved to Skara, where his father died in 1813 and they were forced into declaring bankruptcy. His mother died shortly after. Having been given a good education in French and English, he was able to go to Uppsala and pass his  in 1820. However, it soon came to the attention of Count Lars von Engeström that he was a regular visitor to the "Café des Indépendents", a meeting place for radicals, which effectively ended his career prospects.

After failing to enter the diplomatic corps, he began writing art and literary criticism. His writings became popular so, in 1828, the Swedish Academy offered to name him head of the editorial offices for the Post- och Inrikes Tidningar. He was there until 1830, when he received a warning from the government for an article he translated from the Journal des Débats, supporting the July Revolution in France. After that, he became an employee of the Aftonbladet, where he edited the literature and foreign news sections.

They planned to build it up into a major forum for liberal ideas, with Arfwidsson responsible for the coverages of cultural affairs and foreign policy. Shortly after acquiring it, however, his first wife Charlotta Lovisa Sjöborg died and, in his sadness, he left to travel abroad; sending home travelogues and articles on art and literature. Dalman would remain as editor until 1848.

He also served with the National Archives until 1853, and at the General Customs Board from 1847 to 1863. He worked as the "scenic curator" at the Royal Swedish Opera for a brief period from 1844 to 1845.

Selected writings
 Nord och söder : strödda anteckningar under resor emellan Avasaxa och Vesuven åren 1835-1839, Two Volumes, Bagge, 1842-1843 (Online)
 Liberté. Egalité. Fraternité: ett ord "mellan drabbningarne", 1867, P.B Eklund ( Online)
 Teaterbilder från fordom, published posthumously, Dagligt Allehanda, (Online)

Sources
  Biography from the Svenskt biografiskt handlexikon at Project Runeberg 
 Obituary by Harald Wieselgren, in Ur vår samtid'' at Project Runeberg

1802 births
1880 deaths
Swedish journalists
Swedish editors
Swedish art critics
Swedish literary critics
Swedish theatre critics
Writers from Gothenburg